The 2021 Ashleigh Barty tennis season officially began on 1 February 2021 as the start of the 2021 WTA Tour. Ashleigh Barty entered the season as world number 1 player in singles after an 11-month hiatus following the impact of the COVID-19 pandemic on the 2020 WTA Tour.

All matches

Singles matches

Doubles matches

Mixed doubles matches

Tournament schedule

Singles schedule

Doubles schedule

Mixed doubles schedule

Yearly records

Top 10 wins

Singles

Doubles

Finals

Singles: 6 (5 titles, 1 runner-up)

Doubles: 1 (1 title)

Earnings

References

External links

 
 
 
 

2021 in Australian tennis
2021 tennis player seasons
Ashleigh Barty tennis seasons